John Punter (born 27 January 1949) is a former English record producer and recording engineer. He has worked with many bands and musicians, such as Japan, Procol Harum, Roxy Music, Doctors of Madness, Sad Café and Slade. His career in music spanned over 30 years and many different genres. He is now retired from the entertainment business, and ran a small bar in Peterborough, Ontario, Canada. On July 24, 2019, he became a citizen of Canada.

Selected production, mixing and remixing
Japan - Quiet Life - 1979
Japan - Gentlemen Take Polaroids - 1980
Japan - Oil on Canvas - 1983
Ivan - The Spell
Johnny Cougar - “I Need a Lover” -1978
Spoons - Arias & Symphonies, Vertigo Tango
Bryan Ferry - Let's Stick Together - 1976
Nazareth - Nazareth - 1970
Nazareth - 2XS - 1982
Roxy Music -  Country Life - 1974
Doctors of Madness - Late Night Movies, All Night Brainstorms
Sad Café - Fanx Ta-Ra - 1977
Sad Café - Misplaced Ideals - 1978
Judie Tzuke - Welcome to the Cruise - 1979
Pseudo Echo - Autumnal Park - 1984
Savoy Brown - A Step Further - 1969
Slade - The Amazing Kamikaze Syndrome - 1983
Slade - Keep Your Hands Off My Power Supply - 1984
Slade - Rogues Gallery - 1985
Slade - You Boyz Make Big Noize - 1987
Re-Flex - The Politics of Dancing, 1983
Boulevard - Into The Street - 1990

References

British record producers
Living people
1949 births